Zindagi Live Foundation is a NGO based in Ludhiana, India which works for children affected with Thalassemia by giving them financial help and organizing blood donation camps.

References

Blood Donation Camp For Thalassemia Patients

Ludhiana district
Organisations based in Punjab, India
Health charities in India
2011 establishments in Punjab, India
Organizations established in 2011